Jared Michael Negrete (born September 11, 1978) is a missing person who was last seen on July 19, 1991.

Disappearance
Negrete had gone with his fellow Boy Scouts on a camping trip, which was the first trip that he would spend overnight. He somehow got separated from his group, likely after falling behind and then going off on the wrong trail. Negrete was last seen wearing green Boy Scout 
pants, with a tan-colored T-shirt (possibly a Boy Scout-style T-shirt), and with black
high-top tennis shoes.

Investigation and aftermath
When a search was conducted to find Negrete, twelve snapshots were developed from a camera that was discovered that may have belonged to him. Most pictures on the filmstrip depicted the surrounding landscape, while the last image was a close-up of Jared's face. Only his eyes and nose were visible in the photograph. The 19-day search combed the area of the 11,500-foot Mt. San Gorgonio. Shoe prints were found at about 10,000 feet matching those of Negrete. Also found was his backpack, as well as some beef jerky and candy wrappers, but Negrete himself could not be located. In 2001, Jared's father Felipe Negrete became involved with a case of another hiker who got lost in the same area, a 16-year-old boy named William Parven.

See also
List of people who disappeared

References 

1978 births
1990s missing person cases
1991 in California
Boy Scouts of America
History of San Bernardino County, California
July 1991 events in the United States
Missing American children
Missing person cases in California